Corsaro is an Italian surname. Notable people with the surname include:

Frank Corsaro (1924–2017), American opera and theatre director
Gianni Corsaro (1925–2006), Italian racewalker
Samuel Corsaro (1943–2002), American mobster
Sandro Corsaro, American animator

Italian-language surnames